Isaia Rasila (29 April 1969 – 9 October 2010) was a Fijian rugby union player, who was capped for Fiji on 34 occasions, five as team captain. He played in two Rugby World Cups.

Notes

External links
 Fiji profile

1969 births
2010 deaths
Fijian rugby union players
Rugby union hookers
Fiji international rugby union players
People from Nadroga-Navosa Province
I-Taukei Fijian people